Chili–West Historic District is a national historic district located at Rochester, Monroe County, New York.  The district encompasses 508 contributing buildings (351 primary buildings) in a predominantly residential section of Rochester.  The district developed between about 1874 and 1935, and includes buildings in a variety of architectural styles including Queen Anne, Colonial Revival, Gothic Revival, and Tudor Revival, Mission Revival, and Bungalow / American Craftsman.  The dwellings reflect designs directed toward a middle-class and working class clientele in a newly developing area of Rochester's Nineteenth Ward. Located in the district is the former St. Augustine Roman Catholic Church complex.

It was listed on the National Register of Historic Places in 2015.

See also
 National Register of Historic Places listings in Rochester, New York

References

External links

Historic districts on the National Register of Historic Places in New York (state)
Houses on the National Register of Historic Places in New York (state)
Queen Anne architecture in New York (state)
Gothic Revival architecture in New York (state)
Colonial Revival architecture in New York (state)
Tudor Revival architecture in New York (state)
Mission Revival architecture in New York (state)
Historic districts in Rochester, New York
National Register of Historic Places in Rochester, New York